Alberto Balestrini (born 19 August 1931) is an Argentine fencer. He competed at the 1960 and 1968 Summer Olympics.

References

External links
 

1931 births
Possibly living people
Argentine male fencers
Argentine épée fencers
Olympic fencers of Argentina
Fencers at the 1960 Summer Olympics
Fencers at the 1968 Summer Olympics
Sportspeople from Córdoba Province, Argentina
Pan American Games medalists in fencing
Pan American Games bronze medalists for Argentina
Fencers at the 1959 Pan American Games
Fencers at the 1963 Pan American Games